Sharey Chuattor is a 1953 Indian Bengali-language comedy film, directed by Nirmal Dey, based on a story novel by Bijon Bhattacharya. The film stars Tulsi Chakraborty and Molina Devi in lead and co-starring Uttam Kumar, Suchitra Sen, Bhanu Bandopadhyay, Jahor Roy and Nabadwip Haldar. Contemporary playback singers like Dhananjay, Dwijen Mukherjee, Shyamal Mitra, and Manabendra Mukherjee also acted in this film. This film was under the banner of M.P Production Pvt Ltd.

Plot

The Annapurna Boarding House owned by Rajanibabu (Tulsi Chakraborty) is a peaceful abode where the residents are all friendly except Shibbabu, a senior learned man, who sometimes acts as a killjoy. The story begins when Romola (Suchitra Sen), a relative of Rajanibabu and her family comes to stay in the boarding, after being thrown out of their rented house. Rajanibabu calls a meeting where all the residents except Shibbabu cast vote in favour of Romola's staying.

Rampriti (Uttam Kumar), the son of a wealthy family, who also stays at the boarding, is away home. On the day of his return, he telephones Annapurna Boarding to inform the cook Modon (Nabadwip Haldar) to prepare food for him that night. Seeing no one to answer the phone, Romola picks it up, but Rampriti does not believe that there's a girl in the boarding and so an exchange of hot words takes place. Rampriti, after returning narrates the incident to Kedar (Bhanu Bandopadhyay), another resident of the Boarding. Romola overhears them and berates Rampriti, silencing him.

However, they fall in love and exchange love letters, but this fact becomes known to the other residents and they start teasing both of them. Rajanibabu, the go-between, is given a love letter to deliver but as he's hurrying to catch the train home, he keeps it in his pocket. At home, he quarrels with his wife (Molina Devi) and leaves the house in the middle of night. His wife manages to find the love letter and thinks that her husband is running an extramarital affair.

Seeing that Romola and Rampriti are in love, Rajanibabu makes the marriage arrangements for them and calls Rampriti's  and Romola's father.
Rajanibabu's wife prepares a puja to bring him back. She becomes impatient and goes to the Boarding House. She charges her husband of infidelity and drags him to another room where Rajanibabu tells her the truth about the letter. He says, it  is about Rampriti and Romola, the couple who are getting married the very day. The residents make fun of them and the film ends with Rampriti and Romola sitting side-by-side at the marriage altar.

Cast

Music

Reception
The film became a blockbuster hit at the box office and ran over 56 days in theatre. This film established Uttam and Suchitra in the film industry. The Times of India called the film, "one of the best Bengali old comedy movies which is still a must-watch."

References

External links
 
 http://calcuttatube.com/sharey-chuattar-1953-bengali-movie/119/

1953 films
1953 romantic comedy films
Bengali-language Indian films
1950s Bengali-language films
Indian romantic comedy films
Indian black-and-white films
Films directed by Nirmal Dey